In computing, sort is a standard command line program of Unix and Unix-like operating systems, that prints the lines of its input or concatenation of all files listed in its argument list in sorted order. Sorting is done based on one or more sort keys extracted from each line of input. By default, the entire input is taken as sort key. Blank space is the default field separator. The command supports a number of command-line options that can vary by implementation. For instance the "-r" flag will reverse the sort order.

History
A  command that invokes a general sort facility was first implemented within Multics. Later, it appeared in Version 1 Unix. This version was originally written by Ken Thompson at AT&T Bell Laboratories. By Version 4 Thompson had modified it to use pipes, but sort retained an option to name the output file because it was used to sort a file in place. In Version 5, Thompson invented "-" to represent standard input.

The version of  bundled in GNU coreutils was written by Mike Haertel and Paul Eggert. This implementation employs the merge sort algorithm.

Similar commands are available on many other operating systems, for example a  command is part of ASCII's MSX-DOS2 Tools for MSX-DOS version 2.

The  command has also been ported to the IBM i operating system.

Syntax
 sort [OPTION]... [FILE]...

With no FILE, or when FILE is -, the command reads from standard input.

Parameters

Examples

Sort a file in alphabetical order
$ cat phonebook
Smith, Brett     555-4321
Doe, John        555-1234
Doe, Jane        555-3214
Avery, Cory      555-4132
Fogarty, Suzie   555-2314

$ sort phonebook
Avery, Cory      555-4132
Doe, Jane        555-3214
Doe, John        555-1234
Fogarty, Suzie   555-2314
Smith, Brett     555-4321

Sort by number
The -n option makes the program sort according to numerical value.
$ du /bin/* | sort -n
4       /bin/domainname
24      /bin/ls
102     /bin/sh
304     /bin/csh

The  command with the  option prints file sizes in the 7th field, so a list of the  files sorted by file size is produced by:
 $ find . -name "*.tex" -ls | sort -k 7n

Columns or fields
Use the -k option to sort on a certain column. For example, use "-k 2" to sort on the second column. In old versions of sort, the +1 option made the program sort on the second column of data (+2 for the third, etc.). This usage is deprecated.
$ cat zipcode
Adam  12345
Bob   34567
Joe   56789
Sam   45678
Wendy 23456

$ sort -k 2n zipcode
Adam  12345
Wendy 23456
Bob   34567
Sam   45678
Joe   56789

Sort on multiple fields
The -k m,n option lets you sort on a key that is potentially composed of multiple fields (start at column m, end at column n):
$ cat quota
fred 2000
bob 1000
an 1000
chad 1000
don 1500
eric 500
 
$ sort -k2,2n -k1,1 quota
eric 500
an 1000
bob 1000
chad 1000
don 1500
fred 2000

Here the first sort is done using column 2. -k2,2n specifies sorting on the key starting and ending with column 2, and sorting numerically.  If -k2 is used instead, the sort key would begin at column 2 and extend to the end of the line, spanning all the fields in between. -k1,1 dictates breaking ties using the value in column 1, sorting alphabetically by default. Note that bob, and chad have the same quota and are sorted alphabetically in the final output.

Sorting a pipe delimited file
$ sort -k2,2,-k1,1 -t'|' zipcode
Adam|12345
Wendy|23456
Sam|45678
Joe|56789
Bob|34567

Sorting a tab delimited file
Sorting a file with tab separated values requires a tab character to be specified as the column delimiter. This illustration uses the shell's dollar-quote notation
to specify the tab as a C escape sequence.
$ sort -k2,2 -t $'\t' phonebook 
Doe, John	555-1234
Fogarty, Suzie	555-2314
Doe, Jane	555-3214
Avery, Cory	555-4132
Smith, Brett	555-4321

Sort in reverse
The -r option just reverses the order of the sort:
$ sort -rk 2n zipcode
Joe   56789
Sam   45678
Bob   34567
Wendy 23456
Adam  12345

Sort in random
The GNU implementation has a -R --random-sort option based on hashing; this is not a full random shuffle because it will sort identical lines together. A true random sort is provided by the Unix utility shuf.

Sort by version
The GNU implementation has a -V --version-sort option which is a natural sort of (version) numbers within text. Two text strings that are to be compared are split into blocks of letters and blocks of digits. Blocks of letters are compared alpha-numerically, and blocks of digits are compared numerically (i.e., skipping leading zeros, more digits means larger, otherwise the leftmost digits that differ determine the result). Blocks are compared left-to-right and the first non-equal block in that loop decides which text is larger. This happens to work for IP addresses, Debian package version strings and similar tasks where numbers of variable length are embedded in strings.

See also
 Collation
 List of Unix commands
 uniq
 shuf

References

Further reading

External links

 Original Sort manpage The original BSD Unix program's manpage
 
 
 
 Further details about sort at Softpanorama

Computing commands
Sorting algorithms
Unix text processing utilities
Unix SUS2008 utilities
Plan 9 commands
Inferno (operating system) commands
IBM i Qshell commands